Zdenko Hibšer (8 February 1950 - 25 July 2014) was a Croatian handball player and former coach.

Career
Hibšer entered the first team of Kvarner in 1967. He quickly entered Yugoslav First League with his team and was part of the golden generation of RK Kvarner.

Hibšer played three matches for the Yugoslav national team in November of 1970 at the Carpat Cup in Romania. He scored six goals.

After being suspended in 1976 by the disciplinary committee for missing a match against Partizan Bjelovar due to a work engagement he left Kvarner and joined RK Matulji. He played for Matulji for two seasons and later coached the side.

In 1994 alongside Duško Milošević and Marko Kosanović, Hibšer coached Kvarner and gained promotion to the First B League.

Death
Zdenko Hibšer passed away on 25 July 2014 at the age of 64. He was buried at Kozala cemetery.

Honours

As Player
Kvarner
Yugoslav Second League - West (1): 1974-75
Croatian Unique League (1): 1969-70
Regional League of Primorje and Istra (2): 1967–68, 1968–69

As coach
Kvarner 
2. HRL - West (1): 1993-94

Individual
Best handball player of Rijeka: 1970 and 1971

External links
Petar Orgulić - 50 godina rukometa u Rijeci (2004), Adria public

References

Yugoslav male handball players
Croatian handball coaches
RK Kvarner players
RK Kvarner coaches
Handball players from Rijeka
1950 births
2014 deaths